Round Island is an island in Seychelles, lying in the northeast shores of Mahe.
 
There is also a Round Island near the island of Praslin.

History

In 2005 the island was bought by a Seychellois family with Indian roots and in December 2013 opened the Enchanted Island Resort. JA Resorts & Hotels

Administration
The island is under the  Mont Fleuri District.

Tourism
The island is now home to Enchanted Island Resort by JA Resorts & Hotels, consisting of 10 luxurious villas, a restaurant and bar and a hilltop spa.

Transport
It takes a 15-minute speed boat ride from Mahé to reach Round Island.

Cuisine
Creole Cuisine, infused with the classic techniques of international cooking.

Flora & Fauna
The reefs and lagoons of the island offer a large amount of flora and fauna. Green sea turtles live on the very edges of the coral reefs, and they sometimes venture closer to the island. There are butterfly fish, eagle rays, murray eels and many other species of fish.

Image gallery

References

External links 

 Official Round Island Guide
 National Bureau of Statistics
 info
 Mahe Map 2015
 Info on the island

Islands of Mont Fleuri